Euryops refers to two different groups of organisms.  The name Euryops is probably a contraction of the Greek words  meaning 'wide,' and  meaning 'eye.'

 Euryops, a genus of plants in the family Asteraceae
 Euryops (species group), a wasp species complex in the genus Pison

References